Ras Al Khaimah SC is an Emirati club based in RAK City, Ras al-Khaimah.  They play their home games at the Khalifa bin Zayed Stadium.

Honours
 UAE Division One: 1
 1986–87

References 

RAK
Ras Al-Khaimah
1977 establishments in the United Arab Emirates
Association football clubs established in 1977